Letícia Persiles (born 2 January 1983) is a Brazilian actress and singer who played the lead role in the telenovela Amor Eterno Amor.

Biography 
Born in Rio de Janeiro, Letícia Persiles has a son with her husband, the director Luiz Fernando Carvalho, who she met for the first time during the filming of the 2008 miniseries Capitu.

Career

Acting career 
She played the teenage Capitu in the Rede Globo miniseries Capitu, based on the book Dom Casmurro, by Brazilian writer Machado de Assis. Letícia Persiles played the lead role in the 2012 telenovela Amor Eterno Amor as the journalist Miriam Allende, who is the main romantic interest of the character played by Gabriel Braga Nunes. Letícia Persiles replaced Carol Castro, who was originally cast to play the lead role of the telenovela. She plays Alinne Moraes best friend, Anita, in the 2015 telenovela Além do Tempo.

Singing career 
Letícia Persiles is the vocalist of the band Manacá.

Filmography

Television

Cinema

References

External links 

1983 births
Living people
Musicians from Rio de Janeiro (city)
Brazilian television actresses
Actresses from Rio de Janeiro (city)
21st-century Brazilian singers
21st-century Brazilian women singers